Energy Bank Sao Tome e Principe, also referred to as Energy Bank STP, but commonly known as Energy Bank, is a commercial bank in Sao Tome. It is one of the eight commercial banks licensed by the Central Bank of São Tomé and Príncipe, the country’s banking regulator.

, Energy Bank is a small financial services provider in Sao Tome. The bank’s total assets are estimated at about US$10 million. The shareholders’ equity is estimated at about US$6.8 million.

History
Energy Bank Sao Tome & Principe (STP), commenced operation as Oceanic Bank (STP) on 14 July 2008. Its second branch, in the proximity of the main market was opened on 11 May 2010. A one hundred percent acquisition of the bank was done by Global Fleet (United Kingdom), under the leadership of Dr. Jimoh Ibrahim, OFR - Chairman, which transaction transferred ownership and control of Oceanic Bank in June, 2011.

Ownership
The shares of stock of Energy Bank are privately owned. The major shareholders in the bank are (a) the Global Fleet UK, (b) the Nicon Insurance, STP, the two principal shareholders are linked to Jimoh Ibrahim, the Nigerian industrialist and entrepreneur who serves as the bank's Chairman. The shareholding in the bank's stock is depicted in the table below:

See also
Economy of Sao Tome

References

External links
 Website of Energy Bank Sao Tome
 Website of Bank of Ghana
 Website of Energy Bank Ghana Limited

Banks of São Tomé and Príncipe
Banks established in 2011